ISO 3166-2:GW is the entry for Guinea-Bissau in ISO 3166-2, part of the ISO 3166 standard published by the International Organization for Standardization (ISO), which defines codes for the names of the principal subdivisions (e.g., provinces or states) of all countries coded in ISO 3166-1.

Currently for Guinea-Bissau, ISO 3166-2 codes are defined for two levels of subdivisions:
 3 provinces
 1 autonomous sector and 8 regions

The autonomous sector Bissau is the capital of the country and has special status equal to the regions.

Each code consists of two parts, separated by a hyphen. The second part is either of the following:
 one letter: provinces
 two letters: autonomous sector and regions

Current codes
Subdivision names are listed as in the ISO 3166-2 standard published by the ISO 3166 Maintenance Agency (ISO 3166/MA).

Click on the button in the header to sort each column.

Provinces

Autonomous sector and regions

Changes
The following changes to the entry have been announced in newsletters by the ISO 3166/MA since the first publication of ISO 3166-2 in 1998:

See also
 Subdivisions of Guinea-Bissau
 FIPS region codes of Guinea-Bissau

External links
 ISO Online Browsing Platform: GW
 Regions of Guinea-Bissau, Statoids.com

2:GW
ISO 3166-2
Guinea-Bissau geography-related lists